Bong-3 is an electoral district for the elections to the House of Representatives of Liberia. The constituency covers six wards of Gbanga city (wards 1, 2, 3, 4, 6, 7), 7 communities of Jorquelleh District (i.e. Melekei-One, Wainsue-One, Gbarnay-Two, Wongbai-Three, Gbarmue-Four, Kpanyah-Two, Gbaota-One) and Kayata community of Zota District.

Elected representatives

References

Electoral districts in Liberia